Palmdale Regional Medical Center is a private hospital located in Palmdale, California.

This hospital was the most expensive hospital project Universal Health Services has ever undertaken at US$200 million. Adjacent to the hospital itself is a  medical office tower, called the Palmdale Medical Plaza. The hospital complex will also feature apartment housing for those who need assisted living.

This acute care facility is the only hospital in Palmdale, the largest city in California without a hospital prior to opening in December 2010. It opened with 127 beds, with another 44 beds approved to be added 8 months after opening. The hospital will be able to expand to 239 beds at maximum development.

This new facility features a 35-bed emergency department, the largest in the Antelope Valley area, and a heliport .

References

External links
 Hospital website
 This hospital in the CA Healthcare Atlas A project by OSHPD

Hospital buildings completed in 2010
Buildings and structures in Palmdale, California
Hospitals in Los Angeles County, California